The Catholic Church in São Tomé and Príncipe is part of the Catholic Church, under the spiritual leadership of the Pope in Rome and forms the largest religion in the country.  A majority of the residents São Tomé and Príncipe adhere to Catholicism.

In 2005, about 118,000 (88%) residents of São Tome and Principe were members of the Catholic Church. The country consists of a single diocese, Diocese of São Tomé and Príncipe, which has Manuel António Mendes dos Santos as bishop since 2006. The bishop is a member of the Episcopal Conference of Angola and São Tomé whose president of the Episcopal Conference is Gabriel Mbilingi, bishop of Lubango (Angola). Furthermore, one member of the Inter Regional Meeting of Bishops of Southern Africa and Symposium of Episcopal Conferences of Africa and Madagascar.

The Nuncio of São Tome and Principe is Archbishop Novatus Rugambwa, also Nuncio for Angola. The main Catholic church in the country is the Sé Catedral de Nossa Senhora da Graça in São Tomé.

See also
 Apostolic Nunciature to São Tomé and Príncipe
Roman Catholic Diocese of São Tomé and Príncipe

References

External links
Conferência Episcopal de Angola e São Tomé
Catholic Church in São Tomé and Príncipe
Catholic Church in São Tomé and Príncipe - Catholic-Hierarchy

 
Sao Tome and Principe